Candace Kita (born December 27, 1967) is an American actress.

Career

Acting
Kita's first role was as a news anchor in the 1991 movie Stealth Hunters. Kita's first recurring television role was in Fox's Masked Rider, from 1995 to 1996. She appeared as a series regular lead in all 40 episodes. Kita also portrayed a frantic stewardess in a music video directed by Mark Pellington for the British group, Catherine Wheel, titled, "Waydown" in 1995. In 1996, Kita also appeared in the film Barb Wire (1996) and guest starred on The Wayans Bros.. She also guest starred in Miriam Teitelbaum: Homicide with Saturday Night Live alumni Nora Dunn, Wall To Wall Records with Jordan Bridges, Even Stevens, Felicity with Keri Russell, V.I.P. with Pamela Anderson, Girlfriends, The Sweet Spot with Bill Murray, and Movies at Our House. She also had recurring roles on the FX spoof, Son of the Beach from 2001 to 2002, ABC-Family's Dance Fever and Oxygen Network's Running with Scissors. Kita also appeared in the films Little Heroes (2002) and Rennie's Landing (2001).

Kita guest starred on Method and Red and Quintuplets in 2004 and Two and a Half Men in 2005. She also appeared in Bad News Bears (2005) with Billy Bob Thornton and Greg Kinnear.

In 2005 to 2007, Kita continued work on Complete Savages. She also appeared in the independent films, Faith Happens (2006) and Falling (2008).  In 2006, she was in the pilot for the television series Smith, with Ray Liotta and played a prison inmate in Pepper Dennis with Rebecca Romijn.  Kita also shot a pilot with Tim Stack called The Probe (2006). In 2007, she appeared in an episode of Ugly Betty with Vanessa Williams, and had a role in the Adam Sandler and Kevin James film I Now Pronounce You Chuck and Larry. In 2008, Kita guest starred opposite James Belushi in According to Jim and played herself on an episode of The Jace Hall Show.  She is a guest star in the 100th episode and series finale of Nip/Tuck.

She has also appeared as a guest star in Revenge, Better With You, and Raising Hope among others.

Kita hosted a call-in show on Sway TV on Amazon Live.

Editor
Kita was a managing editor at VIVA GLAM Magazine.

Causes
Kita has been a long-time proponent of women's safety.

Filmography

Film

Television

References

External links

 
 

Female models from California
American film actresses
American models of Japanese descent
1967 births
Living people
American actresses of Japanese descent
American film actors of Asian descent
21st-century American women